The York Hall, officially known as York Hall Leisure Centre, is a multi-purpose indoor arena and leisure complex in Bethnal Green, London, and is situated on Old Ford Road. The building opened in 1929 with a capacity of 1,200 and is now an international boxing venue. The main hall also hosts concerts and other live events and other facilities also include a local gymnasium and a swimming pool.

History
The building, which was designed by the borough engineer and architect A.E. Darby, was officially opened by the Duke and Duchess of York in 1929. It started hosting boxing events in the 1950s.

The historic Turkish Bath or banya in the basement was one of the last publicly run example in the East End of London. In 1972 there were still six Turkish baths, a legacy of the high Jewish population of Russian and Polish origin. This included the traditional suites of Russian and Turkish steam rooms, sauna, relaxation lounge. However, the facility, which is owned by Tower Hamlets Council, was threatened with closure in 2004.

After a major refurbishment in a joint project between the local Tower Hamlets council and Greenwich Leisure, the facility was re-branded as an upmarket Spa London day spa by the council in July 2007. Treatment rooms were added to provide a range of upmarket beauty treatments and other facilities now include a hammam, large sauna, two 'aroma' steam rooms, several hot rooms, a bucket shower, ice fountain and plunge pool.

The facelift included a state-of-the-art gymnasium that doubled the size of the previous gym area, a refurbished reception area and pool, and new changing rooms. The gym features a newly installed functional area including TRX and Technogym's latest functional frame.

Boxing and combat sports 
The hall is where the press conference for the first boxing match between KSI and Logan Paul took place in July 2018. On 29 September 2019, Adam Saleh had a boxing match in that same venue against Marcus Stephenson with FouseyTube vs Slim Albaher as the co-main event.

The hall hosted the UFC London open workouts in March 2019 featuring Darren Till, Dominick Reyes and others.

The hall has also hosted a number of Revolution Pro Wrestling events.

Transport
York Hall is served by Bethnal Green on the London Underground and Cambridge Heath on the London Overground
via Cambridge Heath Road, a range of local London Buses routes also give access, 8, 106, 254, 309, 388, D3 and D6 and night routes N8 and N253.

References

External links
List of boxing bouts and results at the York Hall
Official London Spa website

Buildings and structures in the London Borough of Tower Hamlets
Sport in the London Borough of Tower Hamlets
History of the London Borough of Tower Hamlets
Indoor arenas in London
Sports venues in London
Boxing venues in the United Kingdom
Tourist attractions in the London Borough of Tower Hamlets
Bethnal Green